Həzrə (also, Khazra and Khazry) is a village and municipality in the Qusar Rayon of Azerbaijan.  It has a population of 1,356.  The municipality consists of the villages of Həzrə and Həzrəoba.

Həzrə is located on the shores of the Samur River, which constitutes Azerbaijan's border with the Russian Federation.

References 

Populated places in Qusar District